Highlands Ranch High School, commonly referred to as Ranch or HRHS, is a public high school in Highlands Ranch, Colorado. It is part of the Douglas County School District.

History
Highlands Ranch opened in 1987 as the third high school in the district, after Douglas County High School in Castle Rock and Ponderosa High School in Parker. It was the first high school in Highlands Ranch. The rapid population growth in northern Douglas County has resulted in the opening of three other high schools in the area since Highlands Ranch High School opened.

Sports
Highlands Ranch High School participates at the 5A level in the Colorado Continental League conference. HRHS girls' basketball has had a long-standing dominance in Colorado. Under coach Caryn Jarocki, they won seven state championships between 2000 and 2011.

Performing Arts
Highlands Ranch High School performing arts programs have been recognized nationwide, with their choir even performing at Carnegie Hall.

Notable alumni

 Erin Baxter (class of 1995), former professional soccer player in the WUSA.
 Ryan Burr (class of 2012), pitcher for the Chicago White Sox
 Mike Conneen, reporter for WJLA-TV in Washington, D.C.
 Brian Johnson (class of 1997), former AFL fullback
 Jason Kaiser (class of 1992), former NFL, CFL, XFL and AFL safety
 Mike Purcell (class of 2009), NFL defensive lineman for the Denver Broncos
 Keri Russell, Golden Globe-winning actress and dancer
 Daniel Schlereth (class of 2004), MLB pitcher for the Detroit Tigers and son of ESPN NFL analyst Mark Schlereth
 Brad Stisser (class of 2005), professional soccer player for AC St. Louis
 Ann Strother (class of 2002), Director of Operations for Colorado Buffaloes women's basketball and former WNBA player
 Kasey Studdard (class of 2002), former NFL offensive guard
 Craig Thompson (class of 2004), soccer player for the Real Colorado Foxes
 Courtney Zablocki, (class of 1999) 2-time Olympic luger

References

External links 
 

Public high schools in Colorado
Schools in Douglas County, Colorado
Educational institutions established in 1987
1987 establishments in Colorado